Haji Nawi Station is a rapid transit station on the North-South Line of the Jakarta MRT in Jakarta, Indonesia.

The station is named after Jalan Haji Nawi Raya (Haji Nawi Raya Street) nearby, which in turn is named after Haji Nawi, a Betawi merchant who was the wealthiest person in Gandaria area and owned lands in the station's surrounding areas.

History 

Station layout

References

External links 
  Blok A Station on the Jakarta MRT website

South Jakarta
Jakarta MRT stations
Railway stations opened in 2019